is a song recorded by Japanese singer Maaya Sakamoto. It was released as a double A-side single alongside the song "Shiawase ni Tsuite Watashi ga Shitte Iru Itsutsu no Hōhō" by FlyingDog on January 28, 2015. The song was written by Sakamoto and composed and produced by the Japanese band La La Larks. "Shikisai" is the theme song to the Android and iOS role-playing game Fate/Grand Order. The song also serves as the theme song to the animated television film based on the game, Fate/Grand Order: First Order.

Chart performance
"Shikisai" debuted on the Oricon Singles Chart at number 9, with 10,000 copies sold in first charting week. The single charted on the chart for sixteen weeks, selling a reported total of 17,000 copies sold.

Track listing

Credits and personnel
Personnel

 Vocals – Maaya Sakamoto
 Backing vocals – Maaya Sakamoto, Yumi Uchimura
 Songwriting – Maaya Sakamoto, La La Larks
 Production, all instruments – La La Larks
 Arrangement – La La Larks, Ryō Eguchi, Tōru Ishitsuka
 Electronic keyboard, programming – Ryō Eguchi
 Bass – Keisuke Kubota
 Drums – Turkey
 Electric guitar – Ritsuo Mitsui
 Strings – Tomomi Tokunaga Strings
 Engineering, mixing – Hiromitsu Takasu

Charts

Certifications

References

2015 songs
2015 singles
Anime songs
Video game theme songs
Fate/stay night
Maaya Sakamoto songs
Songs written by Maaya Sakamoto
FlyingDog singles